Municipal elections were held between December 2004 and December 2005, to elect members of local councils in the Palestinian Territories. The elections were approved by President Yasser Arafat of the Palestinian National Authority (PNA), before his death on 11 November 2004. They were administered by the Higher Committee for Local Elections (HCLE), a body established under the authority of the Ministry for Local Government, an institution of the Palestinian National Authority.

It were the first local elections held by the PNA. Previous municipal elections were held in 1972 and 1976, organized by the Israeli occupation power.

Proceeding 
The elections should take place in five rounds, but the fifth was not carried out, because of the situation in Palestinian Territories after formation of Hamas-led government.
Approximately 25% of Palestinians live in districts that did not have elections.
 The first round of elections was held in two parts; the first part on 23 December 2004 in 22 localities in the West Bank and the second on 27 January 2005 in 14 localities in the Gaza Strip. The seats were allocated according to the simple majority system (districts).
 The second round was held on 5 May 2005 in 76 localities in the West Bank and 6 in the Gaza Strip. The seats were again allocated according to the simple majority system (districts).
 The third round of local elections was held on 29 September 2005 in 104 localities in the West Bank only. In this round the seats were allocated according to the proportional representation system (lists).
 The fourth round of local elections was held on 15 December 2005 in 37 population centers in the West Bank and 3 in the Gaza Strip. Seats were also allocated in this round according to the proportional representation system (lists). In some districts elections were canceled.
In the first two rounds, council members were elected by Bloc voting election system, and the third and fourth by Party-list proportional representation.

Jerusalem Governorate
The Jerusalem electoral district was divided into two zones:
 The area of East Jerusalem annexed by Israel with, then, 250 000 Palestinians, holding Israeli ID cards
 The remaining area with 27 Palestinian residential localities, which is occupied, but not annexed

See also
 Municipal election in Bethlehem, 2005

External links

References

2004 elections in Asia
2005 elections in Asia
Elections in the Palestinian National Authority
2004 in the Palestinian territories
2005 in the Palestinian territories
Local elections in Palestine